= Drug studies =

Drug studies may refer to:

- Clinical trials, experiments done to test the safety and effectiveness of medications
- The academic study of psychoactive drugs, chemical substances that alter perception, mood, consciousness or behavior
